Jinsha  is a subdistrict of the Jinping District, Shantou City, Guangdong Province, China.

See also
List of township-level divisions of Guangdong

References

Township-level divisions of Guangdong
Shantou
Subdistricts of the People's Republic of China